Afterworld is a computer-animated American science fiction series created by writer Brent V. Friedman and artist/filmmaker Michael DeCourcey.
Its naturalistic future setting, modeled after traditional Western movie motifs, presents an atypical science fiction backdrop for the narrative. Friedman served as executive producer, along with Stan Rogow.

Afterworld premiered in the United States on YouTube and Bud.tv on February 28, 2007 with the production website being launched in May, 2007.  The series quickly built a loyal fanbase but did not really take off until August, 2007 when it was 're-released' on MySpace.  In conjunction with that release the series was also released in Australia on the Sci Fi Channel, as a mobile podcast, and as a web series on US based Crackle.

The series was also made available by Sony Pictures Television International as 13 half-hour episodes for traditional broadcasters.

Plot
After travelling to New York City on a business trip, Russell Shoemaker wakes to find all electronic technology dead and more than 99% of the human race missing. Driven by a need to discover the truth and determined to return to his family, he embarks on a journey to his home in Seattle, while recording and telling all of the events in his journal. Afterworld is the story of Russell's  trek across a post-apocalyptic America as he encounters the strange new societies rebuilding themselves. Along the way, he also attempts to solve the mystery of what caused this global event, which survivors refer to as "the Fall."

In addition to new forms of government, Russell discovers that technology has failed due to a persistent electromagnetic pulse, a product of a collection of satellites that was activated almost simultaneously to the Fall. An additional side effect of the EMP is the rapid mutation of many forms of life, including Shoemaker himself. He describes that his night vision has improved dramatically, along with his endurance. Other examples are seen in cattle Russell happens across, which are dying of a previously unheard form of necrotizing fasciitis.

Russell's journey eventually brings him to a nearly deserted San Francisco, and the headquarters of an organization known as the Parthia Group, who had developed a form of nano-technology, which identified humans with a particular genetic makeup.

Cast

 Russell "The Walker" Shoemaker - Russell was an American advertising executive and the husband of Janelle and father of Kizzy, from Seattle, Washington. In hope of scoring big by spreading his campaign, he travels to New York City. The next morning he wakes up and finds all technology disabled and most of humanity has vanished. Russell resolves to start travelling home to Seattle to find out what happened to his family. During his journey he comes across many people, creating friends and enemies, as well as does his own investigative efforts into the cause of "The Fall", from what he can find, the theories he hears and also from various factions and individuals during his journey. As time goes by, Russell gradually uncovers the truth and has an increasing effect on the beginnings of the new world. In the Season 1 finale, Russell finally reaches his home and, upon learning Janelle did not survive, but Kizzy did and is in Parthia's custody, now resolves to get his daughter back. He is the protagonist and narrator of Afterworld.
 Janelle "Jan" Shoemaker - Janelle was a social work supervisor and the wife of Russell and mother to his daughter, Kizzy. In the Season 1 finale, Russell learns Janelle was among the 99% of the human race disappeared by "The Fall".
 Kizzy "Kiz" Shoemaker - Kizzy was a 5th grader, and the daughter of Russell and Janelle Shoemaker. She is mentioned as being close to her parents and having high intelligence (as she was in accelerated classes). She is older and wiser than her years imply. In the Season 1 finale, Russell learns that while Janelle did not survive "The Fall", Kizzy did, and Gwen saved her from the Seattle Labor Camp. Currently, Kizzy is in the custody of the Parthia Group.
 Officer Delondre Baines - Delondre was a no-nonsense but fair NYPD mounted police officer with the NYPD Mounted Patrol Division. Delondre witnessed "The Fall" firsthand during her night beat - the event had a profound impact on her. Delondre resolved to help keep the peace in the aftermath that followed, and soon became friends with Russell. After Russell leaves, however, the New York community collapses and disbands and, disillusioned, Delondre wanders the country until she is contacted by the missionaries of New Eden. Converted to their belief system, Delondre is sent to kill “The Walker” (who she does not know is Russell Shoemaker) as one of the Horseman, but is convinced by Russell her belief system is false. After foiling the New World Historians’ plan to ship false information worldwide, and replace it with the truth (from Russell's diary), Delondre leaves the United States to ensure the books reach their destinations, resolving to make spreading the truth her purpose in the new world.
 Eli - Eli was originally a wealthy jeweller in New York, but, in 1999, had a breakdown after a paranoid Eli shot and killed an innocent man who he thought was trying to kill him (but actually just wanted a cigarette). Eli lost everything and became homeless on New York's streets. After "The Fall", Eli rescues Russell when he is severely injured in a bicycle accident. While Eli does not disclose the reasons behind his homelessness, he gives Russell the idea that carrying a gun will only cause more violence and problems, so Russell takes Eli's advice to heart and discards his firearm that Delondre gave him. Eli would appear several more times in the course of Russell's journey, always giving him sound advice when he needed it, and then moving on. It is implied Eli is actually a ghost, as in the dream Eli appeared to Russell, he explained he tried (and possibly succeeded) in killing himself via overdose.
 Jack Hastings - Jack was a United States Congressman who ascended to the position of Speaker of the House of Representatives, making him the third most powerful man in the United States. After "The Fall", Russell, while raiding Hastings's mansion for vital supplies and information, discovers from reading several documents in Hastings' office, that he could be a possible terrorist and key figure involved in "The Fall". Later on, however, it is revealed that, while he is a member of the Parthia Group, "The Fall" itself was an accident. For reasons unknown, Hastings and Parthia have been monitoring Russell's journey and took Kizzy into custody after her liberation by Gwen. Russell is now demanding a meeting with Hastings.
 John "J.D." Daggert - J.D. was an insurance salesman who experienced a life-changing awakening when he witnessed his beloved son Jonah's disappearance during "The Fall" (even getting a picture of the exact moment he vanished). Sinking into depression, J.D. soon gained the belief God had caused the Fall and spared J.D. for the purpose of re-building society in a more religious fashion. To this end, J.D. created a religious cult in New Eden, PA, with J.D. its self-appointed leader and prophet. In truth, J.D. is a psychotic self-deluded madman who sought total control over his followers and total destruction of anything contradicting his beliefs. Russell took away J.D.'s proof - the picture - thus robbing him of the ability to grow his movement, and so J.D. has made many efforts to hunt down and kill Russell, all of which have failed.
 Arnold Shafer Ph.D. - Arnold was originally a Maryland university teacher as the Department Chair of Anthropology, with a Ph.D. in political evolution. Following "The Fall", and having always been a steam train enthusiast due to it being a safer energy and fuel source, fully restored an old locomotive steam train and brought together a group of teachers and scholars named "The New World Historians", travelling the country, operating out of the steam train, spreading the word and reporting news on different areas of the United States. Arnold sought not only to make their point of view, among the many circulating among the survivors, the most known and accepted, but to write a new history of the world itself. Arnold initially approached Russell as a friend and offered him the chance to make history - to join his group, and in so doing get back to Seattle in a month. Russell, taken in and impressed by the group, accepted, only to learn the actual truth from Paul "The Contrarian" Krantz - a conspiracy theorist who was killed by the New World Historians for the secret memo that revealed who The New World Historians really were - Field Operatives of the Parthia Group, seeking to spread their version of the truth instead of what actually happened. After Russell fended off Arnold's efforts to have him hunted down by bounty hunters, conflicts seemed to subside. Russell was forced to defeat a smear campaign launched by Arnold, who tried to label him as a criminal and terrorist. Later they battled again when Arnold was tasked with destroying all evidence of Parthia's links to "The Fall" and spread their version of the truth worldwide. To keep the number of people who knew the truth small, Arnold executed his own men after destroying the headquarters of the company that manufactured the nanomachines used in "The Fall", and then was subdued and held at gunpoint by Russell - who gloated that Arnold's efforts to spread their lies had failed and instead replaced by the truth by Russell and his allies. Arnold was then executed by Subu.
 Charles & Subu - A pair of Army soldiers who became professional mercenaries following "The Fall". The men came into employment of the New World Historians, and were tasked with hunting down and killing Russell and retrieving the incriminating Parthia Group memo he stole by whatever means necessary. Russell evaded pursuit, and much later killed Charles in a brutal fistfight with a knife to the chest. When Arnold and the New World Historians attacked the company that manufactured the nanomachines used in "The Fall" to destroy all evidence, Subu, having witnessed Arnold executing his own men to eliminate all witnesses, makes peace with Russell and, after escaping the building before it is destroyed, Subu executes Arnold and walks away from Russell.

Broadcast history
Bud.tv : February 28, 2007–present
Youtube.com : February 28, 2007–present
Myspace.com : August 2007–present
Sci-Fi Channel : August 2007–present
Vuze.com : March 2008–present
Channel 4 : 2008
AXN East Asia : May, 2008–present (Daily) 7.00pm SIN/PHIL/HK
AXN Beyond (Philippines, Singapore, Hong Kong) : May 2008–present (Daily) 9.00pm SIN/PHIL/HK
ProSieben (German TV) : July 1, 2008 - August 31, 2008 (Daily)
AXN Bulgaria : August 9, 2008–present Mon-Fri at 7.00pm
AXN Czech & Hungary : ? - present Every day at 6.00pm
GO TV South Africa May 2009–Present Mon-Fri 10.30pm
STS Russia summer 2011 - week-end 6.00-8.00am

The complete series 1 was also released as 130 episodes of about 2–3 minutes each.

Afterworld: Global Contact
Sony published a mobile game based before the events of Season 2, but after the catastrophic planetary event known as "The Fall" caused 99% of the world's population to disappear, along with almost all technology. This is a mobile adventure game where different survivors journey the world in search of their families, going from continent to continent, encountering daring adventures in cities such as Paris, Seoul, Sydney and Rio de Janeiro. The players confront each challenge and battle their enemies as they struggle to create communication towers to allow the world to regain global contact. It was launched in September 2008.

The narrative of the game offers a preview of Season 2 which never aired.

Emergency Subnet
First revealed through an ARG (alternate reality game), a UK exclusive online viral series called Emergency Subnet for Channel 4, starred the character Maia Sturn (played by Nathalie Pownall) as a spin-off of Afterworld. It was produced to help promote the launch of the American animated series in the UK. Like Russell, Maia was dealing with the effects of The Fall and being alone in London, England and would document her day-to-day life through video blogs and journal entries using the Emergency Subnet.

See also
List of apocalyptic and post-apocalyptic fiction
Midnight Nation

References

External links

Broadcast Quality Afterworld Episodes: - Released on March 28, 2008 all AW episodes are now available to view in broadcast quality on Vuze (only available in selected countries)
SciFi Channel Australia: Afterworld
AfterworldBlog.info - a blog about "that" aussie season ... (available everywhere)
 

2007 web series debuts
2000s American adult animated television series
American adult animated drama television series
American adult animated mystery television series
American adult animated science fiction television series
American adult animated web series
American science fiction web series
Post-apocalyptic web series